Liz Neumark (born in New York City) is an American chef and entrepreneur.

Neumark is a member of the New York State Food Policy Council and the founder of The Sylvia Center, a nonprofit organization that inspires healthy eating for children through cooking workshops and visits to the farm, and the New York catering company Great Performances.

Life and career 
Neumark graduated from Barnard College in 1977. In 1979, Neumark created Great Performances Caterers, a waitress service for women in the arts. The company is based in Hudson Square, NYC and is today the largest off-premises catering company in New York City. It is the exclusive caterer for notable artistic institutions including Jazz at Lincoln Center, BAM, Apollo Theater, Brooklyn Museum, Caramoor and Wave Hill. In keeping with its appreciation of the arts, Great Performances created the Scholarship Awards Program which supports its event staff members who are pursuing careers as artists with $5000 awards to help them complete a project that will further artistic aspirations.

Neumark recently joint-ventured with Delaware North Companies to manage and operate the Plaza Hotel.

Katchkie Farm is the home of The Sylvia Center, an organization founded by Neumark, where school groups throughout New York visit to plant in the Children's Garden and learn about eating healthy foods.

Neumark is a blogger on food politics for the Huffington Post.

Recognition
She is a recipient of the Food Arts Silver Spoon Award and was named one of the 100 Most Influential Women in NYC Business by Crain's New York. In 2012, she was presented with the Barnard's Woman of Achievement Award.

References

Living people
Barnard College alumni
American bloggers
HuffPost writers and columnists
1956 births
Hudson Square